Route 8A refers to two separate north–south state highways in western Massachusetts.  Both sections are marked as "Route 8A" on guide signs and reassurance markers.  In official documentation, MassHighway denotes one highway as 8A-U, and the other as 8A-L, for "upper" and "lower", respectively.

Unlike Route 2A and other suffixed Massachusetts state highways with multiple sections, both 8A-U and 8A-L bypass the same portion of Route 8, possibly causing confusion for travelers unfamiliar with the area.

Route 8A-L

Route description

8A-L begins at the junction of Route 8 and Route 9 in Dalton.  For its first , Routes 8A & 9 are concurrent, leading into the town of Windsor.  There, Route 8A turns northward, passing through part of the Windsor State Forest, before entering the town of Savoy.  There, the route turns eastward, becoming concurrent with Route 116.  It passes through the town center before crossing into Hampshire County and the town of Plainfield.  

In Plainfield, Route 8A turns northward again, leaving Route 116 and entering the Dubuque State Forest and crossing into Franklin County and the town of Hawley.  It passes through Hawley along winding roads before entering the town of Charlemont.  The road turns eastward, running along the south banks of the Deerfield River for a mile before crossing the river to begin is third and final concurrency, this time with Route 2 along the Mohawk Trail.  After just , the route turns northward again, winding into the town of Heath.  It passes through the villages of the Dell and North Hawley before finally ending at the Vermont state line, entering the town of Whitingham as Vermont Route 8A, which shortly links to Vermont Route 112.

Major intersections

Route 8A-U

Route description
8A-U runs along former Route 8, entirely within the city of North Adams.  It begins at a jughandle intersection with Route 8 south of town, briefly heading east before traveling north for   It closely parallels its parent along this stretch, before entering the downtown area and ending at the Route 2/Route 8 concurrency.

Major intersections

References

008A